Scott Rhodes (born ) is a former Scotland international rugby league footballer who played as a  or  in the 1990s and 2000s. He played at representative level in the 2000 Rugby League World Cup, and at club level for Heworth A.R.L.F.C., Leeds Rhinos (academy), Hull F.C. (loan), Sheffield Eagles, Dewsbury Rams and the York City Knights (captain). He retired from rugby league in October 2008.

Background
Rhodes was born in York, North Yorkshire, England, and he is of Scottish descent through his father.

Career
Rhodes started his rugby league career with junior club Heworth A.R.L.F.C., he was an academy player at Leeds Rhinos, and made two Super League appearances in 2000 while on loan at Hull FC, while at York City Knights during the 2004 National League Two season, coached by Richard Agar, he missed only one match, and scored 15-tries in 35-appearances, and was part of the 2005 National League Two title-winning squad coached by former Sheffield Eagles player Michael "Mick" Cook.

References

External links
The Teams: Scotland

1980 births
Living people
Dewsbury Rams players
English people of Scottish descent
English rugby league players
Hull F.C. players
Rugby league five-eighths
Rugby league halfbacks
Scotland national rugby league team players
Sheffield Eagles players
Rugby league players from York
York City Knights captains
York City Knights players